Rhynchocorys is a small genus of flowering plants belonging to the family Orobanchaceae, formerly classified in the family Scrophulariaceae.
It is native to Europe, Morocco and Algeria.

Etymology 

Phylogeny 
The phylogeny of the genera of Rhinantheae has been explored using molecular characters. Rhynchocorys is the sister genus to Lathraea and Rhinanthus. These three genera share phylogenetic affinities with members of the core Rhinantheae: Bartsia, Euphrasia, Tozzia, Hedbergia, Bellardia, and Odontites. Melampyrum appears as a more distant relative.

Taxonomy 
The genus was described in 1844 by August Heinrich Rudolf Grisebach.
The type species is Rhynchocorys elephas.

Species 
According to the Plant List, 8 species are recognized in the genus Rhynchocorys:
 Rhynchocorys boissieri Post
 Rhynchocorys elephas (L.) Griseb.
 Rhynchocorys intermedia Albov
 Rhynchocorys kurdica Nábělek
 Rhynchocorys maxima Richt. ex Stapf, possibly to be reduced under synonymy of R. elephas
 Rhynchocorys odontophylla R.B.Burb. & I.Richardson
 Rhynchocorys orientalis Benth.
 Rhynchocorys stricta Albov

References 

Orobanchaceae genera
Parasitic plants
Orobanchaceae